Early general elections were held in the Faroe Islands on 8 November 1946. The elections were called after King Christian X dissolved the Løgting following the contentious aftermath of the Faroese independence referendum held in September. The People's Party remained the largest party in the Løgting, winning 8 of the 20 seats. They were the last elections held before the Faroe Islands were granted home rule on 30 March 1948.

Results

References

Faroe Islands
1946 in the Faroe Islands
Elections in the Faroe Islands
November 1946 events in Europe
Election and referendum articles with incomplete results